Pembroke Cricket Club was founded in 1868 and is located at Sydney Parade, Park Avenue, just outside the old village of Sandymount in the prosperous Dublin suburb of Ballsbridge. The grounds were part of the lands of the Pembroke Estate from which the club took its name. In 1983, the club bought out the ground from the Estate and now is the joint owner in conjunction with Monkstown Football Club.

The Club fields six men's teams in league and cup competitions. Players have included Frank Malin, bowler and first man to hold the position of chairman of the Irish Cricket Union. Harry Hill, Master of the High Court, kept wicket from 1947 to 1977.  Hill held the Leinster record with 502 dismissals (292 catches and 210 stumpings), until recently surpassed by Charlie Kavanagh, also a Pembroke wicket keeper.

There are also two ladies' teams and schoolboy-league teams at under-11, -13, -15, -17 -19 age groups. The First XI have a proud record winning the Leinster Senior Cup in its inaugural year, 1935 and on twelve occasions since. It has regularly provided players to the Irish team of whom S.F. Bergin, with fifty-three caps between 1949 and 1965 is the most famous.

The club is an affiliate of the Leinster Cricket Union

Honours
Irish Senior Cup: 1
2019
Leinster Senior League: 13
1923, 1938, 1946, 1951, 1954, 1957, 1967, 1968, 1969, 1973, 1994, 2002, 2019
Leinster Senior Cup: 13
1935, 1944, 1946, 1954, 1957, 1972, 1974, 1980, 1983, 1993, 1997, 1999, 2022

References

External links 
 cricket.ie

Cricket clubs established in 1868
Cricket clubs in County Dublin
Leinster Senior League (cricket) teams
1868 establishments in Ireland
Sports clubs in Dublin (city)